Sruthi Hariharan (born 2 February 1989) is an Indian actress and producer who appears primarily in Kannada language films. She debuted in a 2012 Malayalam film, Cinema Company, and her first film in the Kannada cinema industry was Lucia.

Early life and family
Sruthi Hariharan was born into a Tamil family in Trivandrum, Kerala, and was raised in Bangalore, Karnataka. Her mother tongue is Tamil. She attended school at Sishu Griha Montessori and High School. After high school she attended Christ University and graduated with a Bachelor of Business Management (BBM) degree. She is trained in Bharatanatyam and contemporary dance. Apart from her mother tongue she is fluent in Kannada, Malayalam and Hindi and can understand Telugu.

She became interested in cultural activities when she attended Christ College and became a part of their cultural team. This interest led her into acting in theatre productions. She joined choreographer Imraan Sardariya's dance troupe, and worked in the Kannada film industry as an assistant choreographer and background dancer. She was a background dancer for three years and featured in a number of songs.

Acting career

Sruthi's film career began with Malayalam film, Cinema Company. She acted in two films: Thekku Thekkoru Desathu and Call Me @. In Francis's Call Me @, she played the role of an IT girl, while in Nandu's, Thekku Thekkoru Desathu she played a journalist. She landed the lead role in the Kannada film Lucia by Pawan Kumar. She played two characters in the film—one of a lower middle-class girl and the other of a film actress— and dubbed herself for the first time. Lucia was critically acclaimed and was later remade in several Indian languages. Sruthi's performance was well-received and she was featured on Rediff's Most Impressive Kannada Movie Debuts, 2013 list. Later that year she appeared in another Kannada film Dyavre. The film received rave reviews from critics. She was offered a role in director Harsha's Bhajarangi, featuring Shivraj Kumar in the lead, but she could not commit herself to the film.

In 2014, she was seen as the love interest of Srinagara Kitty's character in Jacob Varghese's road movie Savaari 2. Her next role was in her first Tamil film Nerungi Vaa Muthamidathe directed by Lakshmy Ramakrishnan. Next she acted in A. P. Arjun's Rhaate, which she signed to appear in even before the release of Lucia. Her character in the film was that of a traditional village girl.

In her next feature, she was simultaneously shooting the Kannada film Sipaayi directed by Rajath Mayee, and the Tamil independent art film Nila. She has also signed to appear in another Kannada film, Godhi Banna Sadharna Mykattu by Hemanth Rao, and Balaji Sakthivel's next directorial Ra Ra Rajasekhar.

Godhi Banna Sadharna Mykattu went on to do very well both critically and at the box office. Her portrayal of Dr. Sahana was well received. She appeared next in Maadha Mathu Manasi, produced by Mano Murthy. She achieved further success in the Kannada film industry through her performance in director B.S. Pradeep Varma's Urvi, followed by Beautiful Manasugalu. She struck a balance between commercial and performance-oriented roles by featuring in films of diverse genres.

She next appeared in the Kannada multi-starrer Happy New Year, in which she played the role of a bedridden patient, ailing from psoriasis. After featuring in the bilingual film Vismaya(Kannada) which was titled Nibunan in Tamil, she followed it up with the box office success Tarak, opposite Kannada actor Darshan. The Telugu version of Vismaya, titled Kurukshetra is yet to be released. 
Continuing her foray into the Tamil and Malayalam film industries, she was part of Bejoy Nambiar's film Solo, opposite actor Dulquer Salmaan. Later she acted in a Kannada film Upendra Mathe Baa with veterans Upendra and Prema. As part of the new wave in Kannada films, she acted in Humble Politician Nograj with Danish Sait and Sumukhi Suresh in which she played a supporting role, and was unanimously praised for playing such a character when her career was at a peak. She later acted in National award-winning director Mansore's  Nathicharami opposite Sanchari Vijay for which she gained great critical acclaim. The film publication Karthik Kermanu wrote "There isn’t a better actor than Sruthi to bring grace and seriousness to a character that throws light on the sexual needs of single women in urban middle-class societies. Whenever her face swims in the drudgery of everydayness, you feel her!” Keyur Seta of Cinestaan said "Hers is a simple subtle and a FLAWLESS Performance!" Currently she is filming Aadya starring Chiranjeevi Sarja and directed by Chaitanya KN.

Controversy

In October 2018, Hariharan accused Arjun Sarja of sexual misconduct on the set of the 2016 film Vismaya and filed a sexual harassment case with the police against him.

Arjun Sarja filed a defamation case of Rs 5 crore against her for accusing him of sexual misconduct. In response to her allegations, Arjun responded, "I am saddened by the allegations and I don't know how I can correct this. I will definitely file a case. I will speak about improving the shots and dialogues but I don't have the cheap mentality of using this profession to touch women inappropriately."

A few months after the MeToo fallout, Hariharan told The News Minute that while she used to get plenty of offers before, she hardly gets any now.

Personal life
In 2017, Shruthi married  Raam Kumar, who is a martial artist and trainer and they have a daughter.

Filmography

Awards and nominations

References

External links

 
 

1989 births
Living people
Indian film actresses
Actresses from Thiruvananthapuram
Tamil actresses
21st-century Indian actresses
Actresses in Malayalam cinema
Actresses in Kannada cinema
Actresses in Tamil cinema
Actresses from Bangalore
Actresses in Hindi cinema
Special Mention (feature film) National Film Award winners
Christ University alumni